Christer Samuel Björkman (born 25 August 1957) is a Swedish singer and television producer. He represented Sweden in the Eurovision Song Contest 1992 with the song "I morgon är en annan dag". From 2002 to 2021, he served as a producer of Melodifestivalen, and remained an important figure in Melodifestivalen and the Eurovision Song Contest. He stepped down from this position after Melodifestivalen 2021, and is currently working at Voxovation, a Los Angeles-based company that focuses on expanding the Eurovision Song Contest brand into other markets.

Biography
Björkman was born in Borås as the son of gaming entrepreneur Ulla Björkman (b. 1939). He never met his father while he was alive. He began working as a hairdresser, and soon had his own hair salon in Borås.

In 1985, Björkman started his entertainment career by recording a song called "Våga och vinn", which was produced by Bruno Glenmark.

Björkman won Melodifestivalen 1992 with "I morgon är en annan dag", and represented Sweden at the Eurovision Song Contest 1992. He finished second last, Sweden's worst result at the contest since 1977. He entered Melodifestivalen a second and third time in 1993 with "Välkommen till livet" and 1999 with a song called "Välkommen hem" which finished last among the ten participants.

From 2002 to 2021, Björkman held the position of contest producer of Melodifestivalen.

Björkman was the show producer of the Eurovision Song Contest 2013 in Malmö, Sweden, after Loreen's victory the year prior. He has acted as a juror at the national selections of other countries, and served as contest producer of the Eurovision Song Contest 2016 in Stockholm following Måns Zelmerlöw's victory the year prior.

In 2016, he was chosen to be one of three expert jurors at the Junior Eurovision Song Contest 2016 in Valletta, Malta. In 2018, he was invited as an international juror for Sweden at Destination Eurovision 2018, the French national selection for that year's contest.

Personal life

Björkman is openly gay, and is married to Martin Kagemark.

References

External links

 

1957 births
Living people
People from Borås
Eurovision Song Contest entrants for Sweden
Eurovision Song Contest entrants of 1992
Melodifestivalen winners
Swedish LGBT singers
Swedish gay musicians
Gay singers
20th-century Swedish male singers
21st-century Swedish male singers
20th-century Swedish LGBT people
21st-century Swedish LGBT people
Melodifestivalen contestants of 1999
Melodifestivalen contestants of 1993
Melodifestivalen contestants of 1992